Keith Fairbrother (born 8 May 1944) is a former Chairman and rugby union player of Coventry R.F.C.

He also played for England national team as a prop. He was bought out as Chairman of Coventry R.F.C. in August 2006 by Andrew Green, though he retained the lease to part of the Butts Park Arena site. He had been chairman for eight years. He took over the club after it had gone into receivership in 1998.

In 1974 he switched codes to play for Leigh (Heritage № 847).

Notes

1944 births
Living people
British sports executives and administrators
Coventry R.F.C. players
English rugby league players
English rugby union players
England international rugby union players
Leigh Leopards players
Rugby league players from Coventry
Rugby union props
Rugby union players from Coventry